This article contains information about the literary events and publications of 1842.

Events
January 3 – Charles Dickens sets sail for the United States.
February 14 – Washington Irving is one of the hosts at a public dinner for Charles Dickens in New York.
March – The Book of Abraham by Joseph Smith is presented as being "a translation of some ancient records... purporting to be the writings of Abraham, while he was in Egypt, called the Book of Abraham, written by his own hand, upon papyrus." It is published in two installments in the Mormon periodical Times and Seasons.
c. March 7 – Charles Dickens meets Edgar Allan Poe in Philadelphia.
March 28 – The Teatr Skarbkowski in Lviv opens with the performance of a play by Franz Grillparzer.
May 14
 Alfred, Lord Tennyson, publishes his 2-volume collection Poems, which boosts his reputation; in 1850 Queen Victoria will name him poet laureate.
 The Illustrated London News, the world's first illustrated weekly newspaper, begins publication
June 7 – Charles Dickens leaves New York to return to England.
June 19 – Eugène Sue's fictional The Mysteries of Paris (Les Mystères de Paris) begins to be serialized in the newspaper Journal des débats.
July 1 – The Copyright Act in the United Kingdom provides for authors' copyrights in books to endure for the remainder of the author's life and a further seven years; if this period is less than 42 years from the date of first publication, then the copyright will persist for a full 42 years.
unknown dates
Portions of Fanny Burney's diary and letters are posthumously published.
Julius Springer establishes a bookshop in Berlin which is the origin of Springer Science+Business Media.

New books

Fiction
Honoré de Balzac – La Rabouilleuse (The Black Sheep)
Edward Bulwer – Zanoni
James Fenimore Cooper – The Two Admirals
Nikolai Gogol
Dead Souls («Мёртвые души», Mjórtvyje dúshi)
"The Overcoat" («Шинель», Shinel, short story)
Catherine Gore – The Ambassador's Wife
Jeremias Gotthelf – The Black Spider (Die schwarze Spinne)
Juan Eugenio Hartzenbusch – Primero, yo (First, Myself)
Samuel Lover – Handy Andy
George Sand – Consuelo
Albert Smith – The Adventures of Mr Ledbury
Walt Whitman – Franklin Evans; or The Inebriate

Children
Frederick Marryat – Percival Keene

Drama
Jean-Louis Guez de Balzac – Les Ressources de Quinola (premieres in Paris, March 19)
Nikolai Gogol
The Gamblers («Игроки», Igroki, approximate date of completion)
Marriage («Женитьба», Zhenit'ba, published)
 Gerald Griffin – Gisippus
 George William Lovell – Love's Sacrifice
James Sheridan Knowles – The Rose of Arragon
 John Westland Marston – The Patrician's Daughter
Johann Nestroy – Einen Jux will er sich machen (He Will Go on a Spree, musical adaptation)
Eugène Scribe
Une Chaine
Le Verre d'eau

Poetry

Aloysius Bertrand – Gaspard de la Nuit
Robert Browning – Dramatic Lyrics (includes "My Last Duchess" and "The Pied Piper of Hamelin")
Thomas Babington Macaulay – Lays of Ancient Rome
Alfred Tennyson – Poems  (includes "Locksley Hall", "Morte d'Arthur", etc.)

Non-fiction
Charles Dickens – American Notes
Ralph Waldo Emerson – The Transcendentalist
Victor Hugo – Le Rhin
Udney Hay Jacob – Peace Maker
George Sand – Un Hiver à Majorque (A Winter in Majorca)
William Smith – A Dictionary of Greek and Roman Antiquities
Henry David Thoreau – A Walk to Wachusett
George Catlin - Letters and Notes on the Customs and Manners of the North American Indians

Births
January 20 – Agnes Leonard Hill, American author, journalist, evangelist, social reformer (died 1917)
January 26
François Coppée, French author, le poète des humbles (died 1908)
Hattie Tyng Griswold, American author (died 1909)
February 4 – Arrigo Boito, Italian poet (died 1918)
February 11 – Maria Louise Eve, American author  (died 1900)
February 25 – Karl May, German popular novelist (died 1912)
March 4 – Evelyn Magruder DeJarnette, American author (died 1914)
March 17 – Belle C. Greene, American humor writer (died 1926)
March 18 – Stéphane Mallarmé, French Symbolist poet (died 1898)
March 25 – Antonio Fogazzaro, Italian novelist (died 1911)
June 24 – Ambrose Bierce, American writer (presumed died 1914)
July 7 – William Hastie, Scottish scholar (died 1903)
July 11 – Henry Abbey, American poet (died 1911)
December 23 – Frances Augusta Conant, American journalist and editor (died 1903)
December 31 – Iacob Negruzzi, Romanian poet, columnist and memoirist (died 1932)

Deaths
March 23 – Stendhal, French novelist (stroke, born 1783)
April 7 – Margaret Prior, American memoirist (born 1773)
May 23 – José de Espronceda, Spanish poet (diphtheria, born 1808)
June 5 – Thomas Henry Lister, English novelist and Registrar General (born 1800)
June 17 – Frances Jacson, English novelist (born 1754)
July 28 – Clemens Brentano, German poet and novelist (born 1778)
October 23 – Wilhelm Gesenius, German Biblical commentator (born 1786)
November 6 – William Hone, English satirist and bookseller (born 1780)
December 7 – Thomas Hamilton, Scottish novelist and philosopher (born 1789)

References

 
Years of the 19th century in literature